Kranky may refer to:

 Kranky (director) (born 1976, a.k.a. Laurence Shanet), director of commercials and films, writer, producer
 Kranky (record label), an independent record label based in Chicago

See also
 Cranky (disambiguation)